| tries = 96
| top point scorer =  Samuel Marques (74 points)
| top try scorer =  Raffaele Storti (7 tries)
| Player of the tournament =
| website = 
| previous year = 2019–20
| previous tournament = 2019–20 Rugby Europe International Championships
| next year = 2021–22
| next tournament = 2021–22 Rugby Europe International Championships
}}
The 2020–21 Rugby Europe International Championships is the European Championship for tier 2 and tier 3 rugby union nations. The 2020–21 season is the fourth of its new format and structure, where all Levels play on a one-year cycle, replacing the old format of a two-year cycle, with the teams playing each other both home and away.

For all teams competing in the Championship, this year's edition of the Rugby Europe International Championships doubles as the first year of 2023 Rugby World Cup qualifiers for the European region, where the winner and runner-up teams of the two-year cycle, automatically qualifies to the tournament as Europe 1 and Europe 2. The third team qualifies to the Final qualification tournament.

Countries
Pre-tournament World Rugby rankings in parentheses.

Championship
  * (12)
    (20)
    (17)
    (19)
    (21)
  ↑ (25)

Legend:* Champion of 2019–20 season; ↑ Promoted from lower division during 2019–20 season;

2021 Rugby Europe Championship

{| class="wikitable collapsible collapsed" style="width:100%"
|-
!Matches
|-
|

|}

References

 
2020-21
2020–21 in European rugby union
Europe
Europe